Boruta or Bořuta is a surname. Notable people with the surname include:

Antonín Bořuta (born 1988), Czech ice hockey player
Jonas Boruta, Lithuanian Catholic bishop
Kazys Boruta (1905–1965), Lithuanian writer and poet

See also
Mieczysław Boruta-Spiechowicz (1894–1985), Polish military officer
Boruta (disambiguation)